Casinos Austria, formed in 1967 and based in Austria, is a gaming corporation that owns and operates casinos around the globe. It is one of the largest casino operators in the world. Casinos Austria together with its partners operate in about 40 land-based casinos in 16 countries, 8 shipboard casinos, 15 slot parlors, a range of lottery products in Argentina, and one online gambling platform. Together, the Casinos Austria International (CAI) group’s gaming entertainment operations feature over 750 gaming tables and 7,600 gambling machines. The headquarters of the company was located in the Palais Ephrussi in Vienna from 1969 to 2009. It is now located at Rennweg 44 in the 3rd district of Vienna.

Casinos Austria

Casino Baden
Casino Bad Gastein
Casino Bregenz
Casino Graz
Casino Innsbruck
Casino Kitzbühel
Casino Kleinwalsertal
Casino Linz
Casino Salzburg (at Schloss Klessheim)
Casino Seefeld
Casino Velden
Casino Wien

Casinos Austria International
Casino Canberra, Canberra, Australia
Grand Casino Belgrade
Grand Casino Brussels (opened January 19, 2006)
Grand Casino Luzern
The Reef Hotel Casino, Cairns, Australia

Gallery

References

External links

 Casinos Austria website
 Casinos Austria International website
 Casino Holidays website

Gambling companies of Austria